Goodbye Yesterday is an album featuring performances by jazz saxophonist Lucky Thompson which was released on the Groove Merchant label.

Reception 

Allmusic's Scott Yanow said: "During what would be the final part of his active career, Lucky Thompson recorded 2½ records for Groove Merchant during 1972-73. On his debut for the label, Thompson switches between tenor and soprano ... Thompson contributed all seven compositions (none of which are all that memorable) and, although he plays well enough (he never declined on records), this out-of-print LP is one of his lesser efforts".

Track listing
All compositions by Lucky Thompson
 "Home Come'n" − 3:34
 "Tea Time" − 5:30
 "Lazy Day" − 4:28
 "Soul Lullaby" − 4:30
 "Then Soul Walked In" − 5:03
 "Fillet of Soul" − 6:25
 "Back to the World" − 3:20

Personnel
Lucky Thompson – tenor saxophone, soprano saxophone
Cedar Walton – electric piano, piano, celesta
Larry Ridley – bass
Billy Higgins – drums

References

Groove Merchant albums
Lucky Thompson albums
1973 albums
Albums produced by Sonny Lester